In Greek mythology, Pieria (Ancient Greek: Πιερία) was one of the multiple wives of King Danaus of Libya. By the latter, she bore six princesses: Actaea, Podarce, Dioxippe, Adite, Ocypete and Pylarge. These Danaides married their cousins, sons of King Aegyptus of Egypt and Gorgo. Later on, these women slayed their husbands on their first wedding night under the command of their father. The legendary punishment for them was to try to fill up a hollow tank in Tartarus.

According to Hippostratus, Danaus had all of his progeny by a single woman, Europe, daughter of the river-god Nilus. In some accounts, he married his cousin Melia, daughter of Agenor, king of Tyre.

Notes 

Queens in Greek mythology
Pierian mythology

References 

 Apollodorus, The Library with an English Translation by Sir James George Frazer, F.B.A., F.R.S. in 2 Volumes, Cambridge, MA, Harvard University Press; London, William Heinemann Ltd. 1921. ISBN 0-674-99135-4. Online version at the Perseus Digital Library. Greek text available from the same website.
 Tzetzes, John, Book of Histories, Book VII-VIII translated by Vasiliki Dogani from the original Greek of T. Kiessling's edition of 1826. Online version at theio.com